Neolamprologus christyi is a species of cichlid endemic to Lake Tanganyika.  This species can reach a length of  TL.  It can also be found in the aquarium trade. This cichlid's specific name honours the British naturalist and explorer Cuthbert Christy (1863-1932) who worked for the Belgian Governemant and who collected the type in either 1926 or 1927.

References

christyi
Taxa named by Max Poll
Taxa named by Ethelwynn Trewavas
Fish described in 1952
Taxonomy articles created by Polbot